Anthony Chen (born 18 April 1984) is a Singaporean film director, screenwriter and film producer. He is known for directing the feature films Ilo Ilo (2013) and Wet Season (2019). 

His debut feature film, Ilo Ilo, won the Camera d'Or at the 2013 Cannes Film Festival, making him the first and only Singaporean to have been awarded at Cannes. The film also earned him the Achievement in Directing award at the 2013 Asia Pacific Screen Awards, and the Golden Horse Award for Best Feature Film, Best New Director and Best Original Screenplay.

Early life
Chen was born 18 April 1984, to Bernard and Joan Tai. Interested in film from a young age, Chen attended Nan Hua Primary School and The Chinese High School. He then attended the School of Film and Media Studies at Ngee Ann Polytechnic. His graduating film from Ngee Ann Polytechnic, G-23 (2005), was screened in various international film festivals and won awards in France, Korea and Belgium.

Career

Short films
In 2007 and 2008, Chen went on to direct Ah Ma and Haze respectively. Both attracted favourable criticism. Ah Ma was awarded a Special Mention in the short film competition at the prestigious Cannes Film Festival, making it the first Singaporean film to win an award at the festival.

Following his mandatory conscription in the army, Chen was admitted to the National Film and Television School (NFTS) in the United Kingdom. Graduating in 2010, two of his short films, Distance and Lighthouse, were released that year. These were followed up with Karang Guni (2012) and Homesick (2013). The Break Away (2021) is Chen's short film contribution to the anthology The Year Of The Everlasting Storm, selected at the 2021 Cannes Film Festival.

Feature films

Ilo Ilo, Chen's first feature film, was released on 29 August 2013 in Singapore theatres. Chen served as director, producer, and writer. According to Chen, the film was inspired by a real life maid who worked for Chen's family when he was a child. After its world debut at the 2013 Cannes Film Festival, Ilo Ilo received a 15-minute long "standing ovation" and earned Chen the coveted Camera d'Or. Singapore Prime Minister Lee Hsien Loong noted Chen's achievement, and congratulated him and the film's cast on Facebook.

On 19 October 2013, Ilo Ilo went on to win the Sutherland Trophy for the Best First Film at the London Film Festival. (The same night, one of Chen's tutors at NFTS, Pawel Pawlikowski, won the Best Film Award for Ida).

With Ilo Ilo, Anthony Chen also made history by becoming the first Singaporean to win Best Narrative Feature and Best Original Screenplay at the 50th Golden Horse Awards, while Yeo Yann Yann won Best Supporting Actress for her role in the film. For Ilo Ilo, Chen was named as one of Variety magazine's annual "10 Directors to Watch".

In September 2015, it was announced that Distance, an "omnibus film" for which Chen served as executive producer and writer, will open the 2015 Golden Horse Film Festival in Taiwan. Distance consists of segments by the three directors Xin Yukun, Tan Shijie and Sivaroj Kongsakul, from China, Singapore and Thailand respectively.

In spring 2018, Chen began production on his second feature film, Wet Season, which reunites him with Ilo Ilo stars Yeo Yann Yann and Koh Jia Ler. The film premiered at the Toronto International Film Festival and went on to be nominated for 6 Golden Horse Awards, with Yeo Yann Yann winning her second Golden Horse, for Best Actress.

In February 2022, Chen completed his first Chinese feature film, The Breaking Ice (燃冬). The Breaking Ice is written and directed by Chen, and stars Zhou Dongyu, Liu Haoran, and Qu Chuxiao. According to Variety, this film follows the blossoming relationship among three young adults in their twenties, set over a short few days in the winter snow.

In March 2022, Chen is set to direct Secret Daughter starring Priyanka Chopra Jonas and Sienna Miller.

Chen's first English-language feature, Drift, premiered at the 2023 Sundance Film Festival. It was shot in Greece and stars Cynthia Erivo and Alia Shawkat.

Personal life
In 2009, Chen married Rachel Yan, whom he met while staying in London in 2007. Their son was born in August 2018.

Filmography

Feature films
 Ilo Ilo (2013)
 Wet Season (2019)
 Drift (2023)
 The Breaking Ice (TBA)
 Secret Daughter (TBA)
 We Are All Strangers (TBA)

Short films
 G-23 (2005)
 Ah Ma (2007)
 Haze (2008)
 Hotel 66 (2009)
 Distance (2010)
 Lighthouse (2010)
 The Reunion Dinner (2011)
 Karang Guni (2012)
 Homesick (2013)
The Break Away (2021), as part of anthology The Year Of The Everlasting Storm

References

External links 

 

1984 births
Living people
Singaporean expatriates in the United Kingdom
Singaporean film directors
Singaporean screenwriters
Singaporean film producers
Singaporean people of Chinese descent
Hwa Chong Institution alumni
Ngee Ann Polytechnic alumni
Alumni of the National Film and Television School
Directors of Caméra d'Or winners
Asia Pacific Screen Award winners